Francesco Cosenza (born 5 February 1986) is an Italian footballer who plays for Piacenza.

Club career
Cosenza started his career at Reggina. He then played for Serie B and Serie C clubs, before making his Serie A debut with Reggina on 1 November 2008 against Inter. He also played twice at Coppa Italia 2008-09, before moving to Avellino on loan in January 2009.

On 11 January 2022, he signed a 1.5-year contract with Piacenza in Serie C.

References

External links
Profile at La Gazzetta
Profile at Lega Calcio

1986 births
People from Locri
Footballers from Calabria
Living people
Italian footballers
Association football defenders
Reggina 1914 players
Novara F.C. players
A.S. Melfi players
Taranto F.C. 1927 players
Ravenna F.C. players
U.S. Avellino 1912 players
A.C. Ancona players
F.C. Pro Vercelli 1892 players
F.C. Grosseto S.S.D. players
U.S. Lecce players
U.S. Alessandria Calcio 1912 players
Piacenza Calcio 1919 players
Serie A players
Serie B players
Serie C players
Sportspeople from the Metropolitan City of Reggio Calabria